Elise Nicole Testone is an American singer and songwriter from Mount Pleasant, South Carolina. She placed sixth on the eleventh season of American Idol. Her debut album In This Life was released in February 2014, and her second album, This Is Love, was released in 2019.

Early life
Elise Testone was born to LuAnne and Victor Testone, both of Italian ancestry. She grew up in Kinnelon, New Jersey, and got her first job making sandwiches at Taste of Reality, a local deli. At the age of 13, Testone took lessons with New York City vocal coach Judy Hages. After graduating from Kinnelon High School in 2001, Testone attended Coastal Carolina University in Conway, South Carolina, earning a bachelor's degree in music in 2005.

In 2006, Testone moved to Charleston, South Carolina and began collaborating with local rock, pop, funk, and soul musicians, while writing her own blues and jazz songs. In a November 2008 interview, Testone said she worked at PawPurri for Pets in the mornings. In the afternoons, she was a vocal coach at Music Unlimited in Mount Pleasant, South Carolina. In the evenings, she performed regularly at restaurants and clubs in Charleston, South Carolina. Testone performs solo and with several Charleston groups, including The Freeloaders, James Brown Dance Party, and Slanguage. In October 2011, Testone and her band, The Freeloaders, won the Funk/Soul/R&B Artist of the Year award in the Charleston City Paper’s Music issue. Testone received additional recognition from the Charleston City Paper in 2011, winning the staff pick for Best Tribute for Elise Testone's James Brown Dance Party.

Testone has performed as an opening act for various other artists, including Snoop Dogg, Nappy Roots, Seven Mary Three, and Kevin Costner and Modern West. She can play the piano, guitar, drums, tambourine and cello. Her favorite artists are Bonnie Raitt, Michael Jackson and Jimi Hendrix. Other musical influences include B.B. King, Tori Amos, Erykah Badu, Jewel and Lauryn Hill.

American Idol

Overview 
On July 22, 2011, Testone auditioned in North Charleston, South Carolina. She received a standing ovation in Vegas Round along with Reed Grimm, Eben Franckewitz and Haley Johnsen with their group performance of Bobby Vee's "The Night Has a Thousand Eyes."

In the semi-finals, Testone performed Adele's "One and Only" and was one of five female contestants to advance to the finals based on viewer votes.

In the first round of the finals, Testone performed Whitney Houston's "I'm Your Baby Tonight" and was the female contestant with the lowest number of votes. Between Testone and Jeremy Rosado, the male contestant with the lowest number of votes, the judges decided to eliminate Rosado. Testone and fellow contestant Jessica Sanchez received an endorsement from The X Factor season 1 finalist Chris Rene.

The following week, in the top eleven round, Testone performed "Let's Stay Together" by Al Green and received praise from the judges, with Randy Jackson proclaiming, "America, Elise is back!" Nonetheless, Testone was in the bottom three again. This was not well received by the judges, as Jennifer Lopez explained, "I’m not happy. It's not fair. Great performances should be rewarded. She was one of the best last night."

In the top ten round, Testone sang Billy Joel's "Vienna" and received a standing ovation from the judges. After spending two weeks in the bottom three, Testone was declared "safe" when the voting results were announced. Testone received a second consecutive standing ovation for her performance of Led Zeppelin's "Whole Lotta Love" in the top nine round, which critics considered to be her signature moment of the season. After seeing Testone rehearse before the performance, celebrity mentor Stevie Nicks enthusiastically stated, "If I needed a singer, I'd hire her in a second."

In the top six round, Testone performed Queen's "I Want It All" and The Jimi Hendrix Experience's "Bold as Love". The show's record producer mentor Jimmy Iovine called Testone "a great singer who makes bad [song] choices." She defended her song choices stating, "Those were the best choices for me, but probably the majority of people at home want to be able to sing along."

Testone was eliminated on April 26, 2012, finishing the competition in sixth place.

Performances/results

When Ryan Seacrest announced the results for this particular night, Testone was the female contestant with the lowest number of votes. Between Testone and Jeremy Rosado, the male contestant with the lowest number of votes, the judges decided to eliminate Rosado and save Testone.
 When Ryan Seacrest announced the results for this particular night, Testone was among the Bottom 3, but was declared safe first.
 When Ryan Seacrest announced the results for this particular night, Testone was among the Bottom 3 but declared safe second, as DeAndre Brackensick was eliminated.
 When Ryan Seacrest announced the results for this particular night, Testone was among the Bottom 3 but declared safe second, as Jessica Sanchez received the lowest number of votes and was saved by the judges.
 Owing to the judges using their one save on Jessica Sanchez, the Top 7 remained intact for another week.

Post-Idol appearances
Her journey through American Idol made her realize that rock genre is her forte.  While on American Idols LIVE! Tour 2012, Testone intends to write songs for her album that would include elements of rock, blues, jazz, soul, and funk. Following her elimination, Testone appeared on various talk shows, including Good Day L.A., The Today Show, Anderson, and The Ellen DeGeneres Show. Testone and fellow contestant Colton Dixon performed on The Tonight Show with Jay Leno on April 27, 2012. Testone also performed on Live! with Kelly on April 30, 2012, with a rendition of Adele's "One and Only". She treated Access Hollywood viewers to a reprise of "Let's Stay Together" by Al Green.

At the start of 2013, the singer gathered a number of local Charleston musicians to begin recording her debut album. Self-produced and focussing on her own songs, Testone used a varied of genres to express her personal experiences. Testone released her debut album, In This Life on February 11, 2014. In January 2015 she moved to New York, where she works as a vocal coach. In the same year she released the single "Now" while she continues to tour.

Discography

Albums

Singles

As lead artist

As featured artist

Videography

Music videos

References

External links
 Elise Testone on American Idol
 
 Official Website

21st-century American singers
American Idol participants
American people of Italian descent
Coastal Carolina University alumni
Living people
Singers from New Jersey
People from Kinnelon, New Jersey
People from Mount Pleasant, South Carolina
Singers from South Carolina
21st-century American women singers
Year of birth missing (living people)